What Makes Daffy Duck is a 1948 Warner Bros. Looney Tunes cartoon directed by Arthur Davis. The cartoon was released on February 14, 1948, and stars Daffy Duck and Elmer Fudd.

The title is a play on Budd Schulberg's 1941 controversial novel What Makes Sammy Run?

Plot
Daffy Duck sneaks across the meadow dodging hunter's bullets. He hides behind a tree, his teeth chattering and knees knocking. He is startled on seeing the audience, but calms down and explains, "You see, it's duck season, and, confidentially, I'm a duck!"

He then crawls across the meadow and takes a morning shower while singing "King For A Day". While he sings in the shower, a fox (whom Daffy later addresses as "Fortescue") and Elmer Fudd approach the shower from opposite directions, each unaware of the other's presence. They reach into the shower to grab Daffy, but he emerges from the shower untouched. They look inside the curtain and see their fingers literally tied together, much to their annoyance.

The fox and Elmer start grabbing at Daffy, but Daffy stops them. He tells them to race to a pine tree, and the first one to reach it "gets tender, juicy me as first prize". But when he fires the starting gun, only Elmer takes off; the fox—wise to Daffy's trick—stays behind, grabs Daffy, and flees. Daffy calls to Elmer and tells him he has been swindled. Elmer starts chasing after the fox. Meanwhile, Daffy deliberately squirts oil on the hill, and the fox slides downhill. At the bottom of the hill, Elmer aims his gun at the fox and demands that he leave. The fox turns to escape, only to run smack into a tree, knocking him out cold.

Now Elmer turns his gun on Daffy. But Daffy puts Elmer on a guilt trip, melodramatically complaining about the misery of being constantly pursued by hunters. Catching Elmer off guard, he hits Elmer on the head with a mallet, knocking him out.

A little later, Daffy is admiring himself in a mirror. Elmer puts on a semi-realistic female duck disguise and rubber fishing boots and calls to Daffy from a pond. Daffy begins flirting with the duck, but dives underwater, notices Elmer's boots, and sees through his game. Still, Daffy plays along, and offers to bring some art collectibles for "her" to see. He slips away and awakens the fox (who was still unconscious until now) with a duck call. The fox sees the "female duck", grabs it, and runs away, until he notices the neck stretching. Curiously, he confusedly asks "What kind of a duck is this?" as he opens the lid of the duck costume, and Elmer pops out pointing his gun in the fox's face. Elmer, still in costume, chases after the fox, but is caught by the boot with a long rope, pulling him out of the costume and getting him entirely stuck in the boot, sadly asking himself, "How am I ever gonna catch that scwewy duck?" Daffy, who lassoed him, replies, "Precisely what I was wondering, my little nimrod!"

Suddenly, the fox grabs Daffy by the throat and flees the area with him, trying to put as much distance between himself and Elmer. But just when he thought he had gotten far enough away, he turns and runs into Elmer and his gun. Elmer forces the fox to give up Daffy and sends him away. Then Elmer, by now greatly irritated, drags Daffy away to shoot him, while Daffy calls to the fox to stop Elmer. Elmer pins Daffy to a tree and squeezes the trigger, but instead of gunfire, there is a pop. The fox has returned and stuck his fingers in the gun barrel to stop Elmer. The fox and Elmer start cursing in each other's faces, and their argument turns to fisticuffs, while Daffy watches from atop the tree, cheering them on.

While the fox and Elmer are fighting, a dog in a ranger uniform appears and nails two signs to the tree: DUCK SEASON CLOSED. and FOX SEASON OPEN. He blows a whistle. The fox and Elmer read the signs; Elmer, seeing an opportunity for revenge, glares menacingly at the frightened fox, who flees for his life. The dog gives Elmer a more appropriate hunting hat and a horse to ride, and Elmer chases the fox on horseback. In the end, as the fox, Elmer and his horse run away into the distance, the dog pulls off his rubber mask to reveal Daffy in disguise, and he comments, "Obviously, I am dealing with inferior mentalities."

Home media
All prints have the 1950 green Merrie Melodies ending title card.
VHS - Cartoon Moviestars: Elmer!
LaserDisc - Cartoon Moviestars: Bugs! and Elmer!
LaserDisc - The Golden Age of Looney Tunes, Volume 2, Side 8
Blu-ray/DVD - Looney Tunes Platinum Collection: Volume 2, Disc 1

References

External links

 

Looney Tunes shorts
1948 animated films
1948 short films
1948 films
Cinecolor films
Films directed by Arthur Davis
1940s Warner Bros. animated short films
Films scored by Carl Stalling
Films about hunters
Daffy Duck films
Elmer Fudd films
Animated films about foxes